Klaus Kröppelien (born 29 June 1958) is a German rower who competed for East Germany in the 1980 Summer Olympics.

He was born in Rostock. In 1980 he and his partner Joachim Dreifke won the gold medal in the double sculls competition.

External links
 

1958 births
Living people
Rowers from Rostock
People from Bezirk Rostock
East German male rowers
Olympic rowers of East Germany
Rowers at the 1980 Summer Olympics
Olympic gold medalists for East Germany
Olympic medalists in rowing
World Rowing Championships medalists for East Germany
Medalists at the 1980 Summer Olympics
Recipients of the Patriotic Order of Merit in silver